NYC was a Japanese band. The band's members are  Ryosuke Yamada and Yuri Chinen, who are members of another Japanese band called Hey! Say! JUMP, and Johnny's Jr. Yuma Nakayama in 2010. Before that, seven-members unit NYC Boys (stylized NYC boys) was formed on June 7, 2009, to promote the FIVB World Grand Prix 2009, an event that began on July 31 and ended on August 23, 2009. They performed the theme song "NYC" in Tokyo and Osaka before each game.

History
On June 7, 2009, at the concert "Forum Shinkiroku!! Johnny's Jr. 1 Day 4 Performances Yaruzo!", it was announced that Ryosuke Yamada and Yuri Chinen of Hey! Say! JUMP would join Yuma Nakayama w/B.I.Shadow to form NYC Boys. On July 15, 2009, their first single "NYC/Akuma na Koi", "NYC" being the theme song for the FIVB World Grand Prix 2009, was released. During the announcement for forming NYC Boys, it was said that the group will be a temporary one, only active for the time of the Volleyball Tournament which was from July 31 to August 23, but even after the end of the tournament, the members of the group meet periodically to perform their songs.

In November, the media announced that they would be guest appearing on Japan's highest rated annual music television show, Kōhaku Uta Gassen, on December 31, 2009. Other guest appearances this year include FNS Kayosai on December 2, 2009. On January 1, 2010, media announced that the group would not be a temporary one anymore and that Ryosuke Yamada and Yuri Chinen would be working as members of both Hey! Say! JUMP and NYC Boys in the future.

On March 3, 2010, it was announced on the Johnny's website that NYC without the boys (B.I.Shadow) will release a new single entitled "Yūki 100%" which is opening theme song for an anime entitled Nintama Rantarō. The coupling song entitled "Yume no Tane" will be the ending theme. Their single was released last April 7, 2010. The said song "Yūki 100%" topped Japan Billboards' Weekly Hot 100 and Oricon's Weekly Chart.

On October 20, 2010, NYC released a single titled Yoku Asobi Yoku Manabe. The single became #1 on the Oricon weekly charts in its first week of sales.

On March 9, 2011, the group released a new single with the name of 'Yume Tamago', which peaked first on the Oricon Daily Singles chart with 31,393 sales and ended up in fourth position on the Oricon Monthly singles chart with 154,140 sales, being certified gold by the RIAJ.

In February 2012, NYC released their 4th single which is titled Wonderful Cupid and contains Yuma Nakayama's solo song Glass no Mahou.

In May 2012, NYC released their 5th single which is titled HAINA!.

Members

Current members
 N Nakayama Yuma
 Y Yamada Ryosuke
 C Chinen Yuri

Former members
 Boys
 Kento Nakajima
 Kikuchi Fuma
 Hokuto Matsumura
 Yugo Kochi

Discography

Single

Concert
 Forum Shinkiroku!! Johnny's Jr. 1 Day 4 Performances Yaruzo! Concert (June 7, 2009)
 Johnny's Theater "Summary" 2010
 Hey! Say! JUMP & Yuuki 100% Concert with NYC (April 10, 2011 - May 29, 2011)

References

External links
Johnny's Net

J-pop music groups
Johnny & Associates
Japanese idol groups
Japanese musical trios
2010 establishments in Japan
Musical groups established in 2010
Musical groups from Tokyo